Satanic ritual may refer to:

Rituals
 Black Mass, a ritual characterized by the inversion of the Traditional Latin Mass celebrated by the Roman Catholic Church
 Deal with the Devil, a cultural motif, best exemplified by the legend of Faust and the figure of Mephistopheles, as well as elemental to many Christian traditions
 Greater and lesser magic, a system of magic within LaVeyan Satanism
 Satanic panic, a moral panic that originated in the United States in the 1980s, spreading throughout many parts of the world by the late 1990s, and persisting today

Other uses
 The Satanic Rituals, a 1972 book by Anton LaVey

See also
 Satanic Rites, the third and final demo album by Swiss extreme metal band Hellhammer
 The Satanic Rites of Dracula, a 1973 horror film directed by Alan Gibson and produced by Hammer Film Productions